V T "Tommy" Tatum (July 16, 1919 – November 7, 1989) was an American center fielder in Major League Baseball who played with the Brooklyn Dodgers and Cincinnati Reds in 1941 and 1947. Born in Decatur, Texas, he served in the Army from 1942 to 1946 during World War II.

In 81 games over two major league seasons, Tatum posted a .258 batting average (50-for-194) with 20 runs, 1 home run and 17 RBIs.

He was the manager of the Oklahoma City Indians from 1951 to 1955 after his playing career ended. He died at age 70 in Oklahoma City, Oklahoma.

External links

Baseball Almanac
Baseball in Wartime biography

1919 births
1989 deaths
Brooklyn Dodgers players
Cincinnati Reds players
Major League Baseball center fielders
Baseball players from Texas
Minor league baseball managers
Henderson Oilers players
Nashville Vols players
Los Angeles Angels (minor league) players
Montreal Royals players
Tulsa Oilers (baseball) players
Birmingham Barons players
Syracuse Chiefs players
Louisville Colonels (minor league) players
Fort Worth Cats players
Oklahoma City Indians players
People from Decatur, Texas
United States Army personnel of World War II